Deirdre Byrne (born 21 September 1982) is an Irish middle- and long-distance runner. She represented her country in the 1500 metres at the 2009 World Championships without advancing from the first round.

International competitions

Personal bests
Outdoor
1500 metres – 4:08.89 (Heusden-Zolder 2008)
5000 metres – 15:39.45 (Watford 2016)
Indoor
800 metres – 2:06.00 (Boston 2003)
1500 metres – 4:15.82 (Belfast 2010)
One mile – 4:37.76 (Boston 2007)
3000 metres – 8:58.94 (Doha 2010)

References

1982 births
Living people
Irish female middle-distance runners
Irish female long-distance runners
Competitors at the 2007 Summer Universiade
Competitors at the 2009 Summer Universiade